Antonio Seijas Cruz (Ares, Coruña 19 July 1976) is an art historian, illustrator, photographer, painter and author of comic books.

Biography 
Degree in Art History by the Santiago de Compostela University (1994-1998), he started his work with caricatures, 
published in Galician magazines as Golfiño e Murguía

His first work was released in 2006 under the title Un Hombre Feliz
, with foreword by Miguelanxo Prado.  In October 2012, it adapted the work of Agustín Fernández, Cartas de Inverno. La Luz is his third work, published in March 2014, and this is the winner of the best comic book in Spain.
He is the illustrator of Miña querida Sherezade written by Andrea Maceiras, winner of the Moira Award in 2014.
 and the book Castañeiro de Abril, by Antonio Fraga.
O Soño da Serpe is his first novel, with events in his homeland. It is suitable for youth and adult audiences. 
In the musical area, he is best known for his work on album covers for musicians. A good example is Happiness Is the Road from the band Marillion. 
He contributed to the album Demon, from Norwegian band Gazpacho, and illustrated albums from bands Discanto, Harvest, The Wishing Tree, Nine Stones Close, John Jowitt's arK, 50Hz and The Dave. 

In 2020, he won the award for best graphic novel, with the bookA Chaira, a particularly ambitious work, with literature, drawing and a fantastic book design.

Illustration 

His art was exhibited in several places. He created logos for David Lynch Foundation Music.
He made part of different charitable initiatives, such as 4 Canciones de hambre y esperanza and Canción para un niño en la calle, 
a campaign in which he collaborated with artists as Steve Hogarth, Loquillo, Rebeldes, Lesli, Pep Sala and Jorge Lorenzo.

The television series La que se avecina has his paintings. During episodes they are part of the scenario.

Published Works 
 Magazine Golfiño, number 67, 2003
 Magazine Na Vangarda, number 1 and 2, 2004
 Fanzine of Xornadas, number 13, 2006
Twilight Collection, number 14 and 47, 2007
 Un Hombre Feliz, 2007
 Book tribute to Joan Manuel Serrat, 2008
 Sorrisos e Boa Colleita, number 1, 2008
 Amar unha serea, 2010
 A casiña de chocolate, 2011
 Winter Letters, 2012
 The Balloon Race, 2012
 O Castañeiro de Abril, 2013
 Mediomedo, 2013
 La Oruga en el Bosque Creciente, 2014
 La Luz, 2014
 La oruga en el bosque creciente, 2014
 Miña querida Sherezade, 2015
Amar unha serea, 2016
Miguel tiene un museo, 2017
Onde vai Carlos?, 2017
Doce cartas a María Victoria Moreno, 2018
María Victoria, terra adiante - 2018
O soño da serpe, 2019
A auga, o dragón e o salgueiro chorón - 2019
O gato verde de La Casa de la Troya - 2019
La voz de los muertos - 2019
A Chaira - La Llanura - 2019

Works as Illustrator - Music Albums 

 Firebird (Gazpacho), 2005
 Night  (Gazpacho), 2007
 Happiness Is The Road (Marillion), 2008
 Ostara (The Wishing Tree), 2009
 Tick Tock (Gazpacho), 2009
 4 Canciones de hambre y esperanza, 2009
 Canción para un niño en la calle, 2009
 Happiness Is Cologne (Marillion), 2009
 Gravity (The Dave), 2010
 Live in Montreal Saturday (Marillion), 2010
 Wild Untamed Imaginings (Ark), 2010
 Missa Atropos (Gazpacho), 2011
 Live in Montreal Sunday (Marillion), 2011
 March of Ghosts (Gazpacho), 2012
 Music That Changes The World (Vários), 2012
 Sounds That Can't Be Made (Marillion), 2012
 Demon (Gazpacho), 2014
 Beyond The Seventh Wave (Silhouette), 2014
 Molok (Gazpacho), 2015
 Leaves (Nine Stones Close), 2016
 Absorption Lines (Jet Black Sea), 2017
 Soyuz (Gazpacho), 2018
 Fireworker (Gazpacho), 2020

Awards 
 2nd place in the cultural competition Desafío, 1994
 Awarded at the 7th Cartoonists Competition - 7th Ourense Caricature Biennial, 2004
 Finalist of the Junta de Galicia comic contest, 2004
 2nd place in the comic contest O Alfaiate, on the website Empuje.net, 2005
 1st place in the comic contest Ciudad de Dos Hermanas, 2005
 3rd place in the comic contest Mari Puri Express in Torrejón de Ardoz, 2005
 2nd placed on X Certame from Arteixo, 2005
 Winner of II Premio Castelao da Deputación da Coruña con "Un home feliz", 2006
 Un hombre feliz - Best Script Award, Salón del Comic de Barcelona, 2008
 Winter Letters - Isaac Días Pardo Award for Best Illustrated Book in Galicia, 2012
 La Luz - Named best national work of 2014 in Expocomic
 A Chaira - Named Best Graphic Novel of 2020 - Gala do Libro Galego

References

External links 
  Antonio Seijas's Homepage
  Antonio Seijas's Blog

1976 births
Living people
Spanish art historians
Spanish illustrators
Spanish photographers
Spanish artists